Philippe Pinchemel (10 June 1923 – 16 March 2008) was a French geographer. He received the Lauréat Prix International de Géographie Vautrin Lud in 2004.

Further reading 
 

1923 births
2008 deaths
French geographers
Academic staff of the Lille University of Science and Technology
People from Amiens
Recipients of the Vautrin Lud International Geography Prize
20th-century geographers